Shakespeare, a biographical and critical study of William Shakespeare by Anthony Burgess, was published in 1970. .

1970 non-fiction books
Works about William Shakespeare
Books by Anthony Burgess
Jonathan Cape books